Croix (French for "cross") may refer to:

Belgium
 Croix-lez-Rouveroy, a village in municipality of Estinnes in the province of Hainaut

France
 Croix, Nord, in the Nord department
 Croix, Territoire de Belfort, in the Territoire de Belfort department 
 Croix-Caluyau, in the Nord department
 Croix-Chapeau, in the Charente-Maritime department 
 Croix-en-Ternois, in the Pas-de-Calais department
 Croix-Fonsomme, in the Aisne department 
 Croix-Mare, in the Seine-Maritime department 
 Croix-Moligneaux, in the Somme department 
 Canton of Croix, administrative division of the Nord department, northern France

See also
 Croix Scaille, a hill plateau in the Ardennes, Belgium
 La Croix (disambiguation), including places called "La Croix"
 St. Croix (disambiguation)
 Lac à la Croix (disambiguation)